
An Agenda for a Growing Europe, also called The Sapir Report, is a report on the economy of the European Union edited by a panel of experts under the  direction of André Sapir and published in July 2003.  The report follows an initiative by Romano Prodi, President of the European Commission, notably to analyze the Lisbon Strategy.

André Sapir, who coordinated the redaction of the report, is now a Senior Fellow at the Bruegel think tank and a professor of economics at Université Libre de Bruxelles.

Quotes 

"As it stands today, the EU budget is a historical relic. Expenditures, revenues and procedures are all inconsistent with the present and future state of EU integration."

See also
 Aho report

References

External links 
 Sapir Report (www.unimol.it)
 

Economics publications
Economy of the European Union
Romano Prodi